

Lophotrochozoans

Newly named lophotrochozoans

Sauropterygians

Newly named nothosaurs

See also

References